Böyük Alatəmir (also, Alatemur-Beyuk, Bëyuk Alatemir, and Beyuk-Alateymur) is a village and municipality in the Qakh Rayon of Azerbaijan.  It has a population of 718.

References 

Populated places in Qakh District